Damjan Gojkov (born 2 January 1998) is a Serbian footballer, who plays as a midfielder for OFK Žarkovo.

Career statistics

References

External links
 Damjan Gojkov stats at Utakmica.rs 
 Damjan Gojkov at Serbian First League
 
 
 
 
 

1998 births
Living people
People from Vrbas, Serbia
Association football midfielders
Serbian footballers
OFK Beograd players
FK Bežanija players
Red Star Belgrade footballers
FK Vojvodina players
FK Spartak Subotica players
OFK Žarkovo players
Serbian First League players
Serbian SuperLiga players